William Wogan may refer to:

 William Wogan (religious writer)
 William Wogan (Custos Rotulorum) (died 1625), Custos Rotulorum of Pembrokeshire
 William Wogan (politician) (c. 1638-1708), Member of Parliament